Mohamad Chamas is a Lebanese actor. In 1998 he was living in an orphanage, and had no acting experience, when director Ziad Doueiri cast him in a leading role in the critically acclaimed film West Beirut. He has been described as having "the explosiveness of James Cagney".

Filmography

References

External links

Year of birth missing (living people)
Living people
Lebanese actors